Guinevere Jane Turner is an American actress, screenwriter, and film director. She has written such films as American Psycho and The Notorious Bettie Page and played the lead role of the dominatrix Tanya Cheex in Preaching to the Perverted.

Early life
Turner was born in Boston, and is the oldest of six children. Her paternal grandmother, Elizabeth Hobbs Turner, was a member of the United States Marine Corps in 1944 during World War II.

Turner spent the first eleven years of her life as part of the Lyman Family, raised in various communes around the U.S. with over 100 members who were devotees of Mel Lyman and who believed they would eventually live on Venus. Though Turner acknowledged that the Lyman Family had been portrayed as a cult she argued against using the word to describe them. In accordance with the customs of the Lyman Family, Turner was not raised by her mother, but she and her younger sister were eventually ejected from the Family after their mother chose to leave. Turner considered rejoining the group when she was 18, but eventually chose to attend college.

Career
Turner emerged on the scene with the film Go Fish, which she co-wrote and co-produced with her then-girlfriend, Rose Troche. Turner also starred in the film, portraying a young woman named Max whose friends help her find a new girlfriend, Ely, portrayed by VS Brodie. Director Kevin Smith was a fan of the movie, particularly a scene in it wherein, in an imagined sequence, some of a character's friends chastise her for "selling out" and sleeping with a man, and used it as an inspiration for his own take on a similar theme in his own film Chasing Amy. Turner has cameos in both Chasing Amy and Smith's later film Dogma. Smith also named Joey Lauren Adams' character in Smith's Mallrats after Turner. Another early film appearance was in Cheryl Dunye's 1996 independent film The Watermelon Woman.

Turner and I Shot Andy Warhol director Mary Harron wrote the screenplay for the film version of Bret Easton Ellis' American Psycho, which Harron directed. Turner has a brief cameo in the film, in which she delivers the in-joke, "I'm not a lesbian!". There is also a line about attending Sarah Lawrence College, Turner's real-life alma mater.

A writer and story editor for the first two seasons of The L Word, Turner also made several guest appearances on the show as Alice Pieszecki's screenwriter ex-girlfriend, Gabby.

In 2005, Turner wrote the script for BloodRayne. It was nominated for a Golden Raspberry Award for Worst Screenplay in 2006. In the documentary Tales from the Script, she stated in an interview that director Uwe Boll only used about 25% of her screenplay. In 2005, she co-wrote the script for The Notorious Bettie Page with Mary Harron, who directed the film.  Turner and Harron collaborated again as screenwriter and director, respectively, on the 2018 film Charlie Says.

Turner's first foray into web television was the 2008 online drama series, FEED, directed by Mel Robertson, launched on AfterEllen.com. In 2014 she appeared alongside Nayo Wallace, Candis Cayne and Cathy DeBuono in Jane Clark's horror comedy film Crazy Bitches.

Turner has directed several short films, such as The Hummer and Hung, which have appeared in many international film festivals.

Personal life
Turner is openly lesbian.

Filmography

Film
1994: Go Fish (writer, actress)
1996: The Watermelon Woman (actress)
1997: Chasing Amy (actress)
1997: Latin Boys Go to Hell (actress)
1997: Preaching to the Perverted (actress)
1998: Dante's View (actress) 
1999: Dogma (actress)
2000: American Psycho (writer, actress)
2001: The Fluffer (actress)
2001: Spare Me (short film, writer-director)
2002: Pipe Dream (actress)
2002: Stray Dogs (actress)
2004: Hummer (Short film, writer-director-actress)
2005: Dani and Alice (actress)
2005: BloodRayne (writer)
2005: Hung (short film, writer-director-actress)
2005: The Notorious Bettie Page (writer)
2005: Beyond Lovely (short film, actress)
2006: A Lez in Wonderland (Broute-minou à Palm Springs) (short film, actress)
2007: Itty Bitty Titty Committee (actress)
2008: Late (short film, writer-director)
2008: Little Mutinies (short film, actress)
2008: Quiet Please (short film, director)
2008:  She Likes Girls 3 (video, director)
2010: The Owls (short film, actress)
2012: Breaking the Girls (writer)
2013: Who's Afraid of Vagina Wolf? (actress)
2014: Crazy Bitches (actress)
2016: Superpowerless (actress)
2017: Post-Apocalyptic Potluck (short film, writer-director)
2018: Charlie Says (writer)
2020: I Am Fear (actress)
2022: Candy Land (actress)
TBA: Saint Clare (writer)

Television
2004–2005: The L Word (TV series, writer)
2016: Sugar (web series, director, episode: Chapter 5)

See also
 List of female film and television directors
 List of lesbian filmmakers
 List of LGBT-related films directed by women

References

Further reading

External links
 

Living people
American film actresses
American television actresses
American television writers
American women film directors
American lesbian actresses
American lesbian artists
American lesbian writers
LGBT film directors
American LGBT screenwriters
American women television writers
LGBT people from Massachusetts
Screenwriters from Massachusetts
Actresses from Boston
Actresses from Massachusetts
Writers from Boston
Sarah Lawrence College alumni
MacDowell Colony fellows
Lambda Literary Award for Drama winners
21st-century American women writers
Year of birth missing (living people)